George Dawes Green (born 1954) is an American novelist and the founder of the storytelling organization The Moth.

Books and films
Green published his first novel, The Caveman's Valentine, in 1994. It was adapted into a film in 2001, starring Samuel L. Jackson. He followed it in 1995 with The Juror, which was also adapted into a film, released in 1996, starring Demi Moore and Alec Baldwin. Green did not publish another novel until 2009, when Ravens was released. Set in Green's native Georgia, Ravens was critically acclaimed and hailed by the LA Times as "a triumphant return".

Green's next work, a mystery-suspense novel titled The Kingdoms of Savannah, was published on July 19, 2022, and also takes place in Georgia.

The Moth
In 1997, Green founded The Moth, a not-for-profit storytelling organization based in New York City. The idea for The Moth came from evenings Green spent staying up late with friends, exchanging stories, while moths flitted around the lights.

Works

Novels
 The Caveman's Valentine (1994)
 The Juror (1995)
 Ravens (2009)
 The Kingdoms of Savannah (2022)

Screenplay
 The Caveman's Valentine (2001)

References

External links
 
 The Moth website
 

Living people
1954 births
20th-century American novelists
Novelists from Georgia (U.S. state)
American male novelists
20th-century American male writers
21st-century American novelists
21st-century American male writers